Tygarrup is a genus of centipedes in the family Mecistocephalidae, found mainly in southeast Asia and from the Seychelles to Hawaii. Although species in this genus can have either 43 or 45 leg-bearing segments, most of these species (e.g., Tygarrup anepipe, T. daliensis, T. diversidens, T. griseoviridis, T. javanicus, T. malabrus, T. muminabadicus, T. nepalensis, T. poriger, T. singaporiensis, and T. takarazimensis) have 45 leg pairs. An undescribed Tygarrup species found in the Andaman Islands has 43 leg pairs. Centipedes in this genus range from 2 cm to 6 cm in length. Tygarrup javanicus is one of the smallest of the mecistocephalid species (only 20 mm long) and has become an invasive in greenhouses in Europe.

Species 
Currently accepted species include:
Tygarrup anepipe Verhoeff, 1939
Tygarrup crassignathus Titova, 1983
Tygarrup daliensis Chao, Lee, Yang & Chang, 2020
Tygarrup diversidens Silvestri, 1919
Tygarrup griseoviridis Verhoeff, 1937
Tygarrup intermedius Chamberlin, 1914
Tygarrup javanicus Attems, 1929
Tygarrup malabarus Chamberlin R., 1944
Tygarrup muminabadicus Titova, 1965
Tygarrup nepalensis Shinohara, 1965
Tygarrup poriger Verhoeff, 1942
Tygarrup quelpartensis Paik, 1961
Tygarrup singaporiensis Verhoeff K.W., 1937
Tygarrup takarazimensis Miyosi, 1957
Tygarrup triporus Titova, 1983

References 

Geophilomorpha